Labour Party leadership elections were held in the following countries in 1980:

1980 Labour Party leadership election (UK)
1980 New Zealand Labour Party leadership election